Slippery the Sea Lion was a California sea lion (Zalophus californianus) who in June 1958 escaped from a marine mammal park in London, Ontario, Canada. The animal swam down the Thames to Lake St. Clair, and down the Detroit River to Lake Erie, finally being caught near Sandusky, Ohio by employees of the Toledo Zoo. The escape and subsequent sightings generated a considerable media frenzy, which was exploited by the owners of Storybook Gardens, the sea lion's home. Rumours persisted for decades that park employees had planned the escape as a publicity stunt. A "custody dispute" staged by the Storybook and Toledo parks may have contributed to the impression. He later died in January 1967.

See also
 Tama-chan

References

External links

 A History of Storybook Gardens, Carling Marshall-Luymes, altlondon.org 
CFPL-TV, Footage of Storybook Gardens and Slippery the Seal, ca. 1957–1958, Archives of Ontario YouTube Channel

1967 animal deaths
Wayward seals and sea lions
London, Ontario
Missing or escaped animals
Individual animals in Canada